Neo-Anabaptism is a Christian theological movement in the late twentieth and early twenty-first century inspired by classical Anabaptism. According to Stuart Murray, neo-Anabaptists "identify with the Anabaptist tradition and are happy to be known as Anabaptists, but have no historic or cultural links with any Anabaptist-related denomination".

History and Beliefs
The sociologist James Davison Hunter and anabaptist minister Stuart Murray have both written at length on Neo-Anabaptism, describing the movement in books such as To Change the World: The Irony, Tragedy, and Possibility of Christianity in the Late Modern World and The Naked Anabaptist, respectively. Neo-Anabaptism is characterized by being unified but not monolithic, as they generally agree on ethics but are denominationally diverse and may differ on many theological points. The unification comes from a general focus on nonviolence and the ethics of the Sermon on the Mount as opposed to adhering to strict doctrinal creeds or inhabiting the same denomination. The movement has been compared to New Calvinism in that advocates of each movement tend to be part of various denominations yet are theologically united to some level and find inspiration from Reformation-era individuals and movements (for instance, John Calvin and Reformed theology for New Calvinism; Anabaptist theologians and their forebearers such as Ulrich Zwingli, Menno Simons, and Jacob Hutter for Neo-Anabaptists). 

The original Anabaptists were labeled as "Anabaptists" pejoratively, since critics used the term to highlight the movement's perceived obsession with Believer's baptism, or baptism by full-body immersion in water. Neo-Anabaptists can also see a historical parallel to this pejorative sense of the term with American Calvinist theologian and author Kevin DeYoung article for The Gospel Coalition entitled "The Neo-Anabaptists." In the article, DeYoung labeled multiple ministers and theologians he disagrees with as Neo-Anabaptist, including Scot McKnight, Rob Bell, Brian McLaren, Jim Wallis, Ron Sider, and Shane Claiborne. While Bell, McLaren, and Wallis have not been recorded as identifying as Neo-Anabaptist, McKnight and Sider associate with the terminology while Claiborne has voiced support for Anabaptist theology as well as having written for the Mennonite magazine Anabaptist World. Despite his disagreements with them, DeYoung accurately described how such theologians, in their emphasis on "themes of pacifism, communalism, and placing stress on the ethical commands of Jesus," have been the theological products of 16th century Anabaptism which similarly espoused "a strong emphasis on the commands of the Sermon on the Mount...rejected the use of the oath by Christians, opposed going to war, and denied the rights of Christians to use the civil courts." Greg Boyd is often considered a prominent Neo-Anabaptist in American Christianity.

References

Further reading

Anabaptism
Christian theological movements